Koninklijke Beringen Football Club was a Belgian football club from the municipality of Beringen, Limburg (Belgium).  It existed between 1924 and 2002.

History
The club was founded in 1924 as Cercle Sportif Kleine Heide and it became a member of the Belgian Football Association in 1925 as Beeringen Football Club, matricule n°522.  In 1937 it changed to Beringen F.C. and three years later the club accessed to the first division to play only one season.  After that season, the name changed to K. Beringen F.C. and then to K. Beeringen F.C. one year later.  In 1955 it was back at the top level for two seasons this time.  The other spells of the club in the first division were 1958–1960, 1962–70 (with a 2nd place in 1964), 1972–82 and 1983–84.  In 1972 the club had its last name change from K. Beeringen F.C. to K. Beringen F.C.

From 1984 to 1988 Beringen played in the second division and then at lower levels.  In 2002 the matricule n°522 merged with K.V.V. Vigor Beringen to become K.V.K. Beringen with the matricule n°330 of Vigor.  The club now plays at the same stadium than K. Beringen-Heusden-Zolder.

Former players
 Nick Deacy (1978–80) 42 apps 10 goals

Honours
Belgian Second Division Final Round:
Winners (1): 1983

References
 Belgian football clubs history
 RSSSF Archive – 1st and 2nd division final tables

Association football clubs established in 1924
Defunct football clubs in Belgium
Association football clubs disestablished in 2002
1924 establishments in Belgium
2002 disestablishments in Belgium
Belgian Pro League clubs